Shantou No.1 High School is a key high school in Shantou, Guangdong Province, China. It belongs to the first batch schools of first class in Guangdong Province. Until 2016, this school has a history of 112 years, whose motto is made up of several Chinese characters: patriotism, diligence, realism and fitness. The goals of running this school consist of offering pleasant places for study, developing excellent teachers and cultivating highly-qualified students. 



History 
The introduction of history is divided into three sections according to the time, and each part contains major things related to this school.

1904–1949 
In 1904, Chen Yuting, a rich business man in Chenghai, devoted money to build Huaying Middle School that was managed by English Presbyterian Mission. It was the original form of Shantou No.1 High School, enabling many poor students to get education. In 1925, two sons of Chen Yuting got the school back through laws, and the name was changed into Nanqiang Middle School.

Then it was replaced by another name called Shantou No.1 Municipal Middle School after two years. During the war of Resistance against Japan, this school had moved to Chaoan area, Puning area and other places because of the chaos caused by war. In October 1949, the Shantou People’s Government took in charge of it and officially named it Shantou No.1 Middle School. For commemorating Shantou liberation, this school designated October 24 as the day of school anniversary.

1950–2006 
Shantou No.1 Middle School was designated as Shantou Key Middle School in 1954. Since the Chinese economic reform, it has entered a new stage of development. First of all, changes took place in the school type. In 1993, this school was appraised as a provincial school. During the next four years, it had gradually changed from a middle school to a high school. In 1997, it totally became a high school, so people call it Shantou No.1 High School nowadays.

Secondly, Shantou No.1 High School has been the window of Shantou because of its cooperation with foreign schools. Especially In the 21st century, this school has established friendly relationship with some schools in Kishiwada, Osaka Prefecture, Japan.In 2000, a delegation was sent by Shantou No.1 High School to visit Osaka comprehensive institution of higher learning, participating in its anniversary. Later, this school sent a delegation to pay an inverted visit to Shantou No.1 High School.

Besides, the plan of building a new campus was raised by the Shantou government in 2005 in order to increase the impact of Shantou No.1 High School. The new campus finished construction in 2006 and was put into use after a year.

2007–2016 

Since March 2007, Shantou No.1 High School has kept the running pattern of two campuses in Shantou. The old campus is a day school, but the new one is a boarding school. Both campuses absorb students from grade one to grade three. Overall, there are around seventy classes in this school, among which more than forty classes are in the new campus and the rest belongs to the old campus. In regard to the numbers of students and teachers, in 2016, about 5,000 students are studying at this school and 377 teachers do some teaching. It is planned that the biggest scale of the school will contain 108 classes and over 6,000 students in the future.

During this period, Shantou No.1 High School has made many achievements in various fields. It has combined study of projects of different levels with class teaching. Besides, by setting creative goals, organizing comprehensive practice activities and implementing other methods, students have been promoted to make achievements in many matches. After operating new curriculum, Shantou No.1 High School students had been participated in 364 competitions and 1,424 students had received awards in three years.

Campuses 
Shantou No.1 High School covers an area of around 187,000 square meters. Nowadays, the school has two campuses, one is named the old campus and the other one is called the new campus. There are more details of them as follows.

The old campus 
This campus is located in the Jinping District. It has a reasonable layout, beautiful environment, modern educational equipment as well as installations of the best level in Guangdong Province.

The Main Playground of Shantou No.1 High School 
This playground is located at No. 79, Zhongshan Road. Because of this road, it is parted as an independent place, connecting to the main campus by an artificial bridge. There are running tracks in this playground.

The Sanhao Pavilion 
This Pavilion is situated in the old campus.

The Shixian Yili Building 
The full name of this building is The Shixian Yili Building of Shantou No.1 Middle School. At present this building has largely fallen into disuse except for the student bike park (at the basement), and a handful of minor facilities including the swimming pool, the library, and so on, probably due to the establishment of the new campus.

The Connecting Bridge 
This is an artificial bridge built to connect the main playground to the campus, and it is over the Zhongshan Road which is one of the main roads in Shantou.

The new campus 
The new campus lies in the Wan Ji living area in the Longhu District. It has the space about 162, 667 square meters, among which the building area is 93,000 square meters. This campus is decided and equipped according to the level of model high school in China. Besides, the main architectural style of the new campus is shown like the style of Lingnan Architecture. The new campus has become the most beautiful campus in Shantou.

The Gymnasium 
This is not only the place for students to do sports, but also the school hall for holding assemblies.

The Art Building 
Compared with other buildings, the art building and the library use more liberal shapes in construction. They are set on the opposite direction of the artificial lake.

The Main Teaching Buildings 
These buildings are designed to be incline. There are some special corridors between buildings.

The School Song 
Shantou No.1 High School uses the song School Song of Anti-Japanese Soldiers' School as its temporary school song. It is related to the history of anti-Japanese propaganda during the period of Chinese Cultural Revolution.

The School Uniform 
The newest school uniforms are made of three colors: red, white and black, but the uniforms for boys and girls have some differences. Given the summer uniforms, the girls' shorts are red while those of the boys are white. However, in regard to the winter uniforms, the girls' uniforms use black to be the main color whereas those of the boys use white.

External links
 WeChat Public Account of Shantou No.1 High School: stsdyzx-
  Hu Weiqing. The Common Ideas of Countries Near Seas—Take Shantou Huaying School as A Case Typical Example.2008 China 胡卫清. 海滨邹鲁的国家认同—以汕头华英学校风潮为典型个案.2008.
  A Video of The Sanhao Pavilion(三好亭畔情犹在)
 The MP3 of the Temporary School Song(汕头一中代校歌)

References

Schools in Guangdong